Shermaine Williams (born February 4, 1990) is a Jamaican hurdler. At the 2012 and 2016 Summer Olympics, she competed in the Women's 100 metres hurdles. She is an alumna of Johnson C. Smith University.

Her younger sister, Danielle, is also a hurdler.

Personal bests

International competitions

References

External links

Sports reference biography

1990 births
Living people
Jamaican female hurdlers
Olympic athletes of Jamaica
Athletes (track and field) at the 2012 Summer Olympics
Athletes (track and field) at the 2016 Summer Olympics
World Athletics Championships athletes for Jamaica
Universiade medalists in athletics (track and field)
People from Saint Andrew Parish, Jamaica
Universiade bronze medalists for Jamaica
Medalists at the 2011 Summer Universiade